Edward Henry Joseph Courtney (1905-1986) was an Australian rugby league footballer who played in the 1920s and 1930s.

Background
Ed Courtney Jr. was the son of the noted pioneer Australian rugby league player, Tedda Courtney and brother of Harry Courtney

Playing career
Courtney started his career at Western Suburbs during his father's last year at the club, making them the only known father and son combination ever to play together in the NSWRFL.

Courtney went on to play five seasons at the Western Suburbs between 1924 and 1929. By 1930, he had set up a grocery/bakery business at Scarborough Street, Monterey, New South Wales and he transferred to St. George for his final year in first grade. He stayed in the St. George area for more than 50 years before his death in 1986.

Death
Courtney died on 3 May 1986. He was survived by his wife Stella, his son and daughter.

References

1905 births
1986 deaths
St. George Dragons players
Western Suburbs Magpies players
Australian rugby league players
Rugby league second-rows
Rugby league players from Sydney